Winnie the Witch (also known as Winnie and Wilbur since 2016) is a series of nineteen picture books, written by Valerie Thomas and illustrated by Korky Paul. More than seven million books have been sold of the series, and it has been translated into more than 10 languages.

Following on from the success of the picture books, a series of 'young fiction' Winnie the Witch books were written by Laura Owen, also illustrated by Korky Paul. An animated series based on the books was initially produced for Milkshake!, but only two episodes aired as specials.

Book series

The original book Winnie The Witch was first published in 1987. It was reprinted nine times up until 1997 and re-issued with a new cover in 2006. In 2016, the book series was rebranded from Winnie The Witch to Winnie and Wilbur.

Valerie Thomas has worked for many years in education, teaching in schools in Australia and the UK. Korky Paul is an illustrator of children's books. In 1986, he illustrated his first book for Oxford University Press, Winnie the Witch, which won the Red House Children's Book Award in 1988.

Winnie The Witch (1987) 
Winnie can't find her cat Wilbur in her house, because both her house and Wilbur are black. So she uses magic to turn Wilbur into a variety of colours, each one of which leads to a variety of mishaps and makes Wilbur miserable. In the end, Winnie turns Wilbur back to his original colour and changes the colour of her house instead.

Winnie's New Computer (2003)
Winnie has ordered her first computer (which is illustrated like an iMac G4, but instead of an Apple logo it has a pumpkin on its backside) and logs on to the internet. Wilbur however is  jealous because Winnie spends so much time with her new computer and doesn't even let him touch "the mouse". Winnie decides to throw away her book of spells and her wand - from now on all her magic will be at the click of a mouse! But when Winnie finally goes to bed, Wilbur finally wants to see what this "new mouse" is all about. The next morning Winnie wakes up to discover she has no cat and no computer. It turns out that she still needs her book of spells from time to time. In the end, she manages to get her computer and Wilbur back and decides to keep her magic wand and her book of spells!

Winnie's Midnight Dragon (2006)
Winnie and her cat Wilbur are woken up in the night by a baby dragon.  The dragon sets Winnie's broomstick on fire. Winnie casts a spell to stop the baby dragon breathing fire; unfortunately now he breathes butterflies instead. Wilbur and the baby dragon chase the butterflies, causing much damage to Winnie's house. Winnie chases them to the roof and casts a spell to make a full moon. This allows the baby dragon's mother to see him and she comes to collect him. The dragons fly off and Wilbur and Winnie go to bed.

Bibliography

 1987 Winnie the Witch
 1996 Winnie in Winter
 1999 Winnie Flies Again
 2002 Winnie's Magic Wand
 2003 Winnie's New Computer
 2005 Winnie at the Seaside
 2006 Winnie's Midnight Dragon
 2007 Happy Birthday, Winnie
 2008 Winnie's Flying Carpet
 2009 Winnie's Amazing Pumpkin
 2010 Winnie in Space
 2011 Winnie Under the Sea
 2012 Winnie's Dinosaur Day
 2013 Winnie's Pirate Adventure
 2014 Winnie's Big Bad Robot
 2015 Winnie's Haunted House
 2016 Winnie And Wilbur: Meet Santa
 2017 Winnie And Wilbur: The Naughty Knight
 2018 Winnie And Wilbur: The Monster Mystery
 2019 Winnie And Wilbur: The Bug Safari
 2020 Winnie And Wilbur: At Chinese New Year
 2020 Winnie And Wilbur: Stay at Home (eBook)
 2020 Winnie And Wilbur: Around The World
 2021 Winnie And Wilbur: Winnie's Best Friend

Television series
Winnie the Witch was adopted into a British animated children's television series titled "Winnie and Wilbur". The first two episodes of the series, following the adventures of witch Winnie, and her black cat Wilbur, debuted on Discovery Kids in Latin America on 17 December 2016, and on Milkshake! in the United Kingdom on 24 December. The first season was set for 52 11-minute episodes, but only two episodes were aired.

Characters
 Winnie (voiced by Katy Brand) is an absent-minded witch.
 Wilbur (voiced by Bill Bailey) is Winnie's black cat.

Episodes

Notes

References

External links

Winnie The Witch
2010s British animated television series
2010s British children's television series
2016 British television series debuts
2016 British television series endings
Animated television series about cats
British children's animated fantasy television series
British picture books
Children's fiction books
English-language television shows
Fantasy books by series
Fictional witches
Witchcraft in written fiction